UCLA Health is a health system which comprises a number of hospitals, the David Geffen School of Medicine at UCLA and an extensive primary care network in the Los Angeles region. As a regional health provider, it benefits from the academic affiliation offered by the UCLA campus, as this increases its status in the medical marketplace. For instance, the symbiotic relationship with the campus allowed the creation of nominal assistant professor-level appointments for primary care physicians, but this practice has now been limited because of opposition from the academic community. 

In 2007, UCLA Health founded Operation Mend, a program for treating military veterans who were wounded in wars in Iraq and Afghanistan. In 2016 Operation Mend received a grant from Wounded Warrior Project to expand its offering to include PTSD treatment and became part of the Warrior Care Network.

A 2013 report by the California State Auditor has suggested that the financial transactions from the health system to the medical school, which have grown threefold over the reporting period, deserve more transparency. A study by the Rand Corporation about leadership structures at UCLA Health again addresses the ambiguous position of UCLA Health as both an academic and a commercial entity. More recently, the UCOP has scheduled a bylaw amendment for the Committee on Health Services with a view to change the composition of the leadership structure to enable the UCLA Health System (then so called) to compete and collaborate more effectively in the health services marketplace.

The governance structure includes a non-fiduciary Board of Overseers and a Community Engagement Committee that is made up of faculty and staff and reports to the Vice Chancellor, Health Sciences. In addition, there is a UCLA Health Sustainability Steering Committee.

Budgetary information for bondholders (2013) and the 2014–2015 Financial Report are available through the University of California Office of the President.

Hospitals
 Ronald Reagan UCLA Medical Center
 UCLA Medical Center, Santa Monica
 Resnick Neuropsychiatric Hospital at UCLA
 Mattel Children's Hospital UCLA
 Jonsson Comprehensive Cancer Center

Other entities
 The David Geffen School of Medicine at UCLA is an accredited medical school located in Los Angeles, California, United States. The school was renamed in 2001 in honor of media mogul David Geffen who donated $200 million in unrestricted funds.
 UCLA Faculty Practice Group, a system of more than 1,200 full-time clinical faculty physicians, who work in primary-care and specialty-care offices throughout the Greater Los Angeles Area
 UCLA Health Training Center, an arena and a training center for the Los Angeles Lakers
 Tiverton House, a 100-room hotel facility for patients and their families

See also
James M. Heaps

References

Further reading
 Michelli, Joseph: Prescription for excellence : leadership lessons for creating a world-class customer experience from UCLA Health System. New York: McGraw Hill 2011

External links
 
 UCLA Health Leadership

Health System
Hospitals in California
Academic health science centres
Health care companies based in California
Hospital networks in the United States
UCLA Health